WASP-16b is an extrasolar planet that travels around its star, WASP-16, every 3.12 days. Likely a hot Jupiter. Its mass is near .855 of Jupiter, the radius is 1.008 of Jupiter.  It was discovered in 2009 by a team led by T.A. Lister as part of the Wide Angle Search for Planets project.

Characteriscics
In 2012, it was found from Rossiter–McLaughlin effect what WASP-31b orbit is orbit the slow-rotating and likely old parent star WASP-16 in prograde direction, with WASP-16 star rotational axis inclined to planetary orbit by -4.2

References

External links

 arxiv, WASP-16b: A new Jupiter-like planet transiting a southern solar analog

Exoplanets discovered by WASP
Exoplanets discovered in 2009
Giant planets
Hot Jupiters
Transiting exoplanets
Virgo (constellation)